Elections to Hyndburn Borough Council were held on 6 May 1999.  One third of the council was up for election and the Labour party lost overall control of the council to no overall control.

After the election, the composition of the council was:
Labour 23
Conservative 23
Independent 1

Election result

References
1999 Hyndburn election result
ELECTIONS: Ex-copper ousts Labour leader

1999 English local elections
1999
1990s in Lancashire